Goliath is a steel roller coaster located at Six Flags Magic Mountain amusement park in Valencia, California. Manufactured by Giovanola of Switzerland, the hypercoaster is located in the Goliath Plaza section of the park and opened to the public on February 11, 2000. Its sub-tropical theme is characterized by ancient ruins of the Mayan civilization. The ride is nearly identical to Titan at Six Flags Over Texas, but it lacks a 540-degree upward helix prior to the mid-course brake run and features a slightly shorter track layout.

History
On January 29, 1999, Giovanola roller coaster track arrived at Six Flags Magic Mountain. It was then confirmed that the new attraction would be a hypercoaster.

On November 11, 1999, Six Flags Magic Mountain announced that the new coaster would be named Goliath. The ride officially opened on February 11, 2000.

In November 2013, seat belts were added to Goliath and Full Throttle.

During the 2015 season, Goliath was covered in advertisements to promote Monster Hunter 4, a Nintendo 3DS game. A Gore Magala monster statue was displayed near the entrance. The queue line featured a supply hunt, large signs talking about the game, a camping sit and other props. Plus, the train was wrapped to look like the Gore Magala. A good luck sign was placed in the station and a larger sign was displayed near the exit.

Ride experience
Leaving the station, the train makes a nearly 180 degree right turn. Ascent slows toward the top of the chain lift hill, a safety feature that reduces stress on the chain; it is also an attempt to reduce positive g-forces and increases rider anticipation. Upon exiting the tunnel, the train heads upwards into a banked right turn that towers above Twisted Colossus. After completing the turn, the train heads down another drop, flattening out to pass by the onride camera. An airtime hill and banked left turn (rather than a helix on "Titan") follows into the mid-course brake run. The train is decelerated quickly and makes a hard left turn out of the brake section. Another 180 degree banked turn directs the train into a 585 degree, descending helix. Then, the track turns upwards and banks left. After an ascending right turn, the train reaches the final brake run.

Photos

Operation
 long tunnel at the bottom of the first drop.
Ride capacity: 1,600 passengers per hour. 
Three five-car 30-passenger trains, with two abreast seating.
A small error was made while the ride's parts were being manufactured by Giovanola. The very last track piece before the final brake run was about  too short. The mistake was found while the final piece was being bolted to the ride, and a supplementary track piece had to be made to fill the  gap.

Use in media

Appeared as “The Scream Monster” in Judy Moody and the Not Bummer Summer
Appeared as “Aquaman: The Ride” in Entourage (Season 3 Episode 3 "Dominated")
Appeared in the Zoey 101 episode "Roller Coaster"
Appeared in James Corden's Carpool Karaoke video with Selena Gomez
Appeared in The Anna Nicole Show (2002)
Appeared in The King of Queens episode "Emotional Rollercoaster"

Awards

Incidents
On June 2, 2001, a 28-year-old woman died from what was thought to be a heart attack while riding Goliath, later determined to be a brain aneurysm. The park closed the ride for several hours and reopened it the same day after it passed inspection.

References

External links

Official website
Official Goliath on-ride POV video

Roller coasters in California
Roller coasters operated by Six Flags
Roller coasters introduced in 2000
Six Flags Magic Mountain
Articles containing video clips